Clarendon County School District 2 is located in Clarendon County, South Carolina, United States.

See also
Clarendon County School District 1

References

External links

Education in Clarendon County, South Carolina
School districts in South Carolina